Ryazan-VDV (Рязань-ВДВ) is a Russian women's football team from Ryazan.

History
Founded in 1996, it won two league titles and one cup in the last years of the twentieth century. Ryazan-VDV was the first team to represent Russia in the UEFA Women's Cup.

Around 2013 a team of Russian and Ukrainian nationals was formed, winning a league title in 2013 and the Russian Cup in 2014. The club played in the 2014–15 UEFA Women's Champions League.

Honours

Official
 Russian championship (4): 1999, 2000, 2013, 2018
 Russian Women's Cup (2): 1998, 2014

Invitational
 Albena Cup (1): 2003

Current squad

Former players
Players listed in bold have had caps for their respective countries

  Anna Astapenko (2009–2010)
  Natalia Barbashina (1999–2001)
  Elena Danilova (2005)
  Marina Kolomiets (2001)
  Anastasia Kostyukova (2005–2006)
  Olga Letyushova
  Elena Morozova
  Olesya Mashina (2009–2010)
  Olga Sergaeva (1998–1999, 2002–2003)
  Elena Terekhova (2005)
  Elvira Todua (2005–2007)
  Tatiana Zaitseva
  Elena Turcan
  Daryna Apanaschenko (2005–2008)
  Veronika Shulga (2000–2001, 2010)
  Natalia Zinchenko (1997–2002, 2005–2006)

UEFA competitions

Ryazan played the very first season of the UEFA Women's Cup and reached the quarter-finals.

References

External links
Official website

 
Women's football clubs in Russia
Association football clubs established in 1996
1996 establishments in Russia
Sport in Ryazan